Trifecta Entertainment & Media is an American entertainment company founded in 2006. The company's founders previously held jobs as executives at MGM Television. Trifecta is primarily a distribution company and also handles advertising sales in exchange for syndication deals with local television stations, cable outlets, and digital media. Secondary, the company produces television programs and made-for-TV and direct-to-video movies. The company has offices in Los Angeles, California and New York City, New York.

Titles distributed by Trifecta Entertainment & Media

Current

Programs 
 The Carbonaro Effect
 Celebrity Page (formerly OK!TV)
 Cheaters
 Dish Nation
 The First 48
 Forensic Files
 iCrime with Elizabeth Vargas
 Impractical Jokers
 Pawn Stars
 Protection Court
 Small Town Big Deal
 Storage Wars
 Whacked Out Sports
 Whacked Out Videos

Movies 
 Paramount Pictures (pre-1928 and post-1949 films)
 DreamWorks Pictures (pre-2010 films)
 DreamWorks Animation (pre-2013 films) under license from Universal Pictures
 Television rights to films from The Cannon Group, Inc., Epic Productions and Nelson Entertainment under license from Metro-Goldwyn-Mayer, and Carolco Pictures under license from StudioCanal
 Rysher Entertainment film catalog including titles from Bing Crosby Productions
 Miramax film catalog including titles from the pre-2005 Dimension Films library
 Screen Media Films

Former

Programs 
 America Now
 American Idol Rewind
 Animal Atlas (2009–2011)
 Animal Exploration with Jarod Miller
 The Best of Soul Train (December 2007 – September 2008)
 Bloopers
 Cold Case Files
 Cookie Jar TV (ad sales)
 Dog the Bounty Hunter
 Eco Company (ad sales)
 Elvira's Movie Macabre
 Future Phenoms (ad sales)
 The Game Plane
 Hollywood Shootout
 Jack Hanna's Animal Adventures
 Judge Faith
 Last Shot with Judge Gunn
 Leverage
 M@dAbout TV (ad sales)
 Million Dollar Challenge (ad sales)
 MTV series:
 Punk'd
 Laguna Beach
 The Hills
 The City
 MTV Cribs
 NASCAR Angels
 Republic of Doyle
 Saf3
 Mystery Hunters
 Smithsonian Channel
 Sports Stars of Tomorrow (ad sales)
 Star Wars: The Clone Wars (2012–2013)
 Storm Stories
 UFC Wired

References

External links 
 Trifecta website

Mass media companies established in 2006
Television syndication distributors